Linwood Female College was a women's college associated with the Associate Reformed Presbyterian Church (ARP). It was located at the foot of Crowder's Mountain, near Gastonia, North Carolina, USA. Founded around 1884 by Emily Prudden as a girls' finishing school, it soon became the ARP-associated Jones Seminary, thanks to the financial backing of Judge Edwin S. Jones of Minneapolis, Minnesota. After the retirement of college president Rev. A.G. Kirkpatrick, the college was taken over by Dr. Archie Thompson Lindsay, a local ARP minister. A year later, Lindsay asked the student body to propose a new name for the college since it was no longer under the ownership of Judge Jones, and the all-female student body put together the name "Linwood" by honoring the president and the wooded area surrounding the school.

The college operated as Linwood Female College from 1904 until 1915, when it became a coeducational school in an attempt to improve its financial situation. The name was then shortened to Linwood College, and remained so until the college closed due to financial difficulties in 1921.

On December 26, 1916 The Charlotte News reports the following:  "Miss Riggins Chosen Lady Principal of Linwood College - Miss Eunice Riggins, one of the most successful teachers in this county, who since early fall has been a member of the faculty of Linwood College, Gastonia, has been elected lady principal of the college. Miss Riggins is popular with faculty and student body and her friends are confident she will wear her new honor worthily."

Today, other than a few brick foundations, there is hardly any evidence that a campus ever existed. The area is now within the boundaries of Crowder's Mountain State Park.

See also
 List of current and historical women's universities and colleges

Defunct private universities and colleges in North Carolina
Educational institutions established in 1884
Associate Reformed Presbyterian Church
1884 establishments in North Carolina
Women in North Carolina